The Baku uezd was a county (uezd) within the Baku Governorate of the Russian Empire and then of Azerbaijan Democratic Republic and Azerbaijan SSR until its formal abolishment in 1929. The uezd was located in eastern part of the Baku Governorate, bordering Caspian sea to the east, Shemakha uezd to the west, Kuba uezd to the north and Lenkoran uezd to the south. The administrative center of the uezd was the village Sarai (present-day Saray).

History
After the capture of the Baku Khanate by the Russian Empire in 1806, during the Caucasus Campaign, the khanate was removed and was made a province of the Russian Empire. The uezd was created in 1840 and was initially made part of the Caspian Oblast and later part of the Shemakha Governorate in 1846. As a result of the devastating earthquake in Shamakhi in 1859, the administrative center of the Shamakhi Governorate was transferred to Baku, resulting in the subsequent renaming of the governorate to the Baku Governorate.

After the collapse of the Russian Empire in 1917, the area of modern-day Azerbaijan became part of Transcaucasian Democratic Federative Republic, during which the city of Baku and its peripheries were under the control of the Baku Commune which perpetrated the March Days Massacre against the Azerbaijani population of Baku. Shortly after the dissolution of Transcaucasia and the establishment of 3 independent republics including the Azerbaijan Democratic Republic, Baku again became the site of massacre in the revengeful September Days Massacre against the Armenian population, following the Battle of Baku and the city's capture by Ottoman-Azerbaijani forces. Baku subsequently became the new capital of the nascent Azerbaijani republic, the government relocating there from its original western capital in Ganja, which was also the capital of the neighboring Elisabethpol Governorate.

In 1920, after the decisive establishment of Soviet power in Azerbaijan, the Baku uezd was retained as an administrative unit within the Azerbaijan SSR until its formal abolishment in 1929 during a territorial-administrative reorganisation of the nation.

Administrative divisions 
The subcounties (uchastoks) of the Baku uezd in 1912 were as follows:

Demographics

Russian Empire Census 
The majority of the population indicated Tatar to be their mother tongue, with significant Russian, Tat, and Armenian speaking minorities.

Kavkazskiy kalendar 

Soviet census (1926) 
The population of the uezd rose significantly to 527,220 people by 1926 as a result of the significant expansion of the Baku Oil Fields.

Notes

References

Bibliography 

Geographic history of Azerbaijan
States and territories established in 1840
1840 establishments in the Russian Empire
1929 disestablishments in the Soviet Union
Uezds of Baku Governorate
Uezds of the Soviet Union
States and territories disestablished in 1929